Coleophora luteochrella is a moth of the family Coleophoridae. It is found in southern Spain and southern, eastern and northern Portugal.

Adults have a pale ochreous head, thorax and labial palpus. The forewings are light ochreous to ochreous, irrorated with ochreous-brown-tipped scales. The hindwings are light grey.

Etymology
The specific name is derived from the Latin luteus (meaning yellow) and ochra (meaning ochre). The specific name refers to the color of the forewing.

References

External links

luteochrella
Moths described in 2009
Moths of Europe